"Töres döttrar i Wänge" ("Töre's daughters in Vänge") or "Per Tyrssons döttrar i Vänge" ("Per Tyrsson's daughters in Vänge") is a medieval Swedish ballad (SMB 47; TSB B 21) which Ingmar Bergman's The Virgin Spring is partly based on. The ballad type is found throughout Scandinavia, with variants in Danish (DgF 338), Faroese (CCF 176), Icelandic (IFkv 15), and Norwegian (NMB 49). The Child Ballad "Babylon" is analogous to the Scandinavian songs.

Story 

The ballad, which tells the traditional, local legend about why the 12th-century church in Kärna (near Malmslätt in Östergötland, Sweden) was built, was still being sung in the early 19th century, when Erik Gustaf Geijer and Arvid August Afzelius were collecting songs for their three-volume 800-page work Svenska folk-visor från forntiden ("Ancient Swedish folksongs"), published 1814 and 1816.

The ballad appears in the third volume, in three versions: the one sung by Greta Naterberg for Afzelius' and Geijer's assistants "J. H." and "D. S. Wallman" in 1812, and two older versions found in manuscript in the Swedish Royal Library; the first accompanied by the note "Pehr Jonson in Frisle sung this song in June 1673". The second is very similar, but has a different refrain and links the song to the nearby church of Kaga instead of Kärna.

The gist of the story is clearer in the 1673 version, which is longer than the one recorded in 1812: The three daughters of Pehr Tyrsson (Töre) and his wife Karin are killed by three highwaymen when on their way to church. Three wells spring up where the three maidens are killed. The men later visit the family farm and try to sell the girls' silk shirts. Karin recognises them and realises that the daughters must have been killed by the men, so she tells her husband. He kills two of them, but lets the third live. When he and Karin ask the surviving highwayman who they are and where they come from, he tells them that they were brothers who had been sent away by their parents when very young, to fend for themselves in the world, and that their parents were Töre and Karin in Vänge. Realizing that he has killed his own sons, Töre then vows to build a church to atone for his sins.

According to the notes preceding the ballad, the well of Vänge (Vänge brunn), which appeared at the spot where the young maidens lost their heads, still existed in the 17th century, according to a manuscript from 1673, and an old smithy in the forest nearby was held to be haunted at midnight by the apparitions of the young girls.

A note after the song recorded in 1812 states that the singer, Greta Naterberg, had told the recorders that "vallare" (which usually is understood to mean "herdsmen") here means "robbers" or "highwaymen".

Localization
Besides Östergötland, the ballad and legend have been localized to several other places in Sweden, as well as in the other Scandinavian countries. According to Francis James Child, the story has been connected with "half a dozen localities in Sweden" and (citing Svend Grundtvig) "at least eight [in] Denmark".

Ballad
The version of the ballad sung by Greta Naterberg in 1812, as recorded by assistants J. H. and/or D. S. Wallman and printed in Svenska folkvisor från forntiden vol. 3 (1816):

See also 

 The Virgin Spring, a Swedish film based on the ballad

References

External links
Per Tyrssons döttrar performed by Slaka Balladforum, Trio Frikadell and Torgny Lundberg
Per Tyrsson's Daughters in Vänge on the Balladspot blog

Scandinavian folklore
Ballads